Başar Önal (born 8 May 2004) is a football player who plays as a winger for De Graafschap in the Eerste Divisie. Born in the Netherlands, he is a youth international for Turkiye.

Professional career
Önal began playing football with the youth sides of DZC '68 at the age of 5, before being scouted with De Graafschap at 8 years old.
He worked his way up their youth categories, eventually promoting straight to their senior team in 2022. He made his senior and professional debut with De Graafschap as a late substitute in a 3–1 Eerste Divisie loss to MVV Maastricht on 18 March 2022. On 15 April 2022, he signed his first professional contract with De Graafschap for 3 seasons.

International career
Önal is a youth international for Turkey, having played up to the Turkey U19s.

Personal life
Önal was born in the Netherlands to Turkish parents. He is a childhood fan of the Turkish club Fenerbahçe.

Playing style
Önal began playing football as a left-back, before moving to left winger as a U17. He is a fast attacker  who is good at handling the ball and getting past opponents. He likes having the ball at his feet, and attacking from the flanks or as a false striker.

References

External links
 
 

2004 births
Living people
People from Doetinchem
Turkish footballers
Turkey youth international footballers
Dutch footballers
Dutch people of Turkish descent
De Graafschap players
Eerste Divisie players
Association football wingers